"Close My Eyes Forever" is a duet by Lita Ford with Ozzy Osbourne from Ford's 1988 album Lita. It was later remixed and released as a single titled "Close My Eyes Forever (Remix)" in 1989, with the single only differing from the album version in sound quality editing. The song was written by Ford and Osbourne as the result of an accident in the studio, during which they both drank heavily and inadvertently wrote the lyrics to the song together. This song is Ford's highest charting single, peaking at number eight on the U.S. Billboard Hot 100 chart in 1989 and also peaked at number 25 on the U.S. Billboard Album Rock Tracks chart. It is also Osbourne's highest charting single of his solo career. "Close My Eyes Forever" was one of four singles from the album Lita.

Chart performance

Weekly charts

Year-end charts

Covers 
The song was covered in 2013 by David Draiman's solo project Device, with the part of Lita Ford being done by Lzzy Hale from Halestorm.

References 

1988 songs
1989 singles
Lita Ford songs
Ozzy Osbourne songs
RCA Records singles
Songs about depression
Songs about suicide
Song recordings produced by Mike Chapman
Songs written by Ozzy Osbourne
Male–female vocal duets
Glam metal ballads